Yorktown Township may refer to:

Yorktown Township, Henry County, Illinois
Yorktown Township, Dickey County, North Dakota